Killaly is a village in the Canadian province of Saskatchewan within the Rural Municipality of McLeod No. 185 and Census Division No. 5. The village is located 23 km south of the City of Melville on Highway 47 at the intersection of Highway 22 and 47, and only 17 minutes north of Crooked Lake.

History 
Killaly incorporated as a village on April 28, 1909.

Demographics 

See also 

 List of communities in Saskatchewan
 Villages of Saskatchewan

References 

Villages in Saskatchewan
McLeod No. 185, Saskatchewan
Division No. 5, Saskatchewan